List of monarchs may refer to:

List of current sovereign monarchs
List of current constituent monarchs
List of living former sovereign monarchs
List of monarchs by nickname
List of fictional monarchs
A king list, used as an early form of periodisation

By current countries
Note: The list includes both current monarchies and current countries that have abolished the monarchy.

Afghanistan
Albania
Andorra
Antigua and Barbuda
Armenia
Australia
Austria (and Austria-Hungary)
The Bahamas
Bahrain
Barbados
Belize
Belgium
Benin
Bosnia
Bhutan
Brazil
Brunei
Bulgaria
Burundi
Cambodia
Canada
Central Africa
China
Croatia
Czechia
Denmark
Egypt
Estonia
Eswatini
Ethiopia
Fiji
Finland
France
The Gambia
Georgia
Ghana
Germany
Grenada
Greece
Guyana
Haiti
Hungary
Iceland
India
Iran
Iraq
Ireland
Israel
Italy
Jamaica
Japan
Jordan
Kenya
Korea
Kuwait
Laos
Lesotho
Libya
Liechtenstein
Lithuania
Luxembourg
Madagascar
Malawi
Malaysia
Maldives
Malta
Mauritius
Monaco
Mongolia
Mexico
Montenegro
Morocco
Myanmar
Nepal
New Zealand
Netherlands
Nigeria
Niue
Norway
Oman
Pakistan
Papua New Guinea
Poland
Portugal
Qatar
Romania
Russia
Rwanda
Saint Kitts and Nevis
Saint Lucia
Saint Vincent and the Grenadines
Saudi Arabia
Serbia
Sieraa Leone
Soloman Islands
South Africa
Spain
Sri Lanka
Syria
Sweden
Thailand
Tonga
Trinidad and Tobago
Tunisia
Turkey (Ottoman Empire)
Tuvalu
Uganda
Ukraine
United Kingdom and predecessors
Vietnam
Yemen

Defunct countries
Note: These countries no longer exist and neither does the monarchy.

Ailech
Anhalt
Aragon
Argos
Athens
Axum
Babylon
Baden
Bavaria
Bora Bora
Bosporan Kingdom
Brandenburg
Brunswick
Brunswick-Wolfenbüttel
Burgundy
Byzantine Empire
Castile
Connacht
Cyrene
Dál Riata
East Anglia
Essex
the Franks
Galicia
Hanover
Hawaii
Hejaz
Hesse
Hohenzollern
Huahine
Illyria
Inca Empire (Tawantinsuyu)
the Isles
Jerusalem
Kent
Kush
Leinster
León
Lippe
the Lombards
Lorraine
Lüneburg
Lydia
Macedonia
Mecklenburg
Meissen
Mercia
Mide
Milan
Modena
Munster
Naples
Navarre
Northumbria
Numidia
Oldenburg
Palatinate
Parma
the Picts
Pomerania
Pontus
Prussia
Raiatea
Reuss
Roman Empire
Rome
Ryukyu
Saxony
Schleswig-Holstein
Schwarzburg
Sicily
Sparta
Strathclyde
Sussex
Swabia
Tahiti
Tanganyika
Tenochtitlan (Aztec Empire)
Thuringia
Transylvania
Tuscany
Two Sicilies
Waldeck
Wallachia
Wessex
Württemberg
Yugoslavia
Zanzibar

Fictional
List of fictional monarchs
Galactic Empire (Isaac Asimov)

See also
List of current pretenders